Purjangi may refer to:
 Purjangi, Khash
 Purjangi, Zahedan